Crown Gardens is a suburb of Johannesburg, South Africa. It is located in Region F of the City of Johannesburg Metropolitan Municipality.

History
The suburb is situated on part of two old Witwatersrand farms called Ormonde and Vierfontein. It was established on 2 March 1950 and takes its name from Crown Mines.

References

Johannesburg Region F